Koutoua Francis Abia (born August 13, 1965) is an Ivorian sprint canoer who has competed since the early 1990s. At the 1992 Summer Olympics in Barcelona, he was eliminated in the repechages of the K-2 500 m event. Four years later in Atlanta, Abia was eliminated in the repechages of the K-1 500 m event. At his third and most recent Summer Olympics in Beijing, he was eliminated in the first round in both the K-1 500 m and the K-1 1000 m events.

External links
Sports-Reference.com profile

1965 births
Canoeists at the 1992 Summer Olympics
Canoeists at the 1996 Summer Olympics
Canoeists at the 2008 Summer Olympics
Ivorian male canoeists
Living people
Olympic canoeists of Ivory Coast